Eupithecia nabagulensis is a moth in the  family Geometridae. It is found in Uganda.

References

Moths described in 1935
nabagulensis
Moths of Africa